The Apple Studio Display (stylized and marketed as Studio Display) is a 27-inch flat panel computer monitor developed and sold by Apple Inc. It was announced on March 8, 2022, alongside the Mac Studio desktop, and was released on March 18, 2022. It is Apple's consumer display, sitting below the Pro Display XDR.

Overview
The Studio Display is the first Apple-branded consumer display released since the Apple Thunderbolt Display, which was released in 2011 and discontinued in 2016. In the interim, Apple worked with LG to design the Thunderbolt 3-enabled UltraFine line, consisting of a 21.5-inch 4K and a 27-inch 5K display.

The Studio Display features a 27-inch, 5K LED-backlit panel, with 5120×2880 resolution at 218 pixels per inch and 600 nits of brightness, an increase from the 500  panel used in the LG UltraFine and 27-inch iMac. The panel also supports P3 wide color and True Tone technology. It does not support HDR content. It also includes a six-speaker system with force-cancelling woofers that support spatial audio and Dolby Atmos, and a three-microphone array that supports "Hey Siri". On the rear of the display is a Thunderbolt 3 port that supports DisplayPort 1.4 with Display Stream Compression (DSC) 1.2 and provides up to 96 W of host charging for connected laptops, and three downstream 10 Gbit/s USB-C ports.

The Studio Display includes an Apple A13 Bionic system on a chip to power audio and webcam processing. The built-in webcam supports Center Stage, introduced with the iPad Pro (5th generation), which pinpoints the positions of the users and automatically tracks the camera view accordingly to perspectively center them. The display also is reported to contain 64 GB of internal storage but only using 2 GB at a time. It is possible this is simply a side effect of the use of the A13 chip, likely the one found in the base model iPhone 11.

The Studio Display comes with three mounting options: a tilt-adjustable stand, a tilt- and height-adjustable stand similar to the Pro Display XDR, and a VESA mount. The mounts are built into the display and are not user interchangeable, but can be reconfigured by an Apple Store or authorized service provider after purchase. Like the Pro Display XDR, it can also be configured with the optional laser-etched "nano-texture" glass finish to reduce glare.

The Studio Display has a  proprietary power cable, which requires a special tool to separate from the display.

Compatibility
The Studio Display is compatible with all Macs with Thunderbolt 3 or Thunderbolt 4 running macOS Monterey 12.3 and later:
 MacBook Pro (2016 or later)
 MacBook Air (2018 or later)
 Mac Mini (2018 or later)
 iMac (2017 or later)
 iMac Pro (2017)
 Mac Pro (2019)
 Mac Studio (2022)
The Studio Display works with other systems supporting DisplayPort, including Windows-based systems, but only supported Macs have access to features beyond display, speakers and webcam. Intel Macs running Windows via Boot Camp are supported with version 6.1.17.

It is also compatible with the following iPads running iPadOS 15.4 and later:
iPad Pro (3rd generation or later)
iPad Air (5th generation or later)

Technical specifications

See also
Apple displays
Apple Studio Display (1998–2004)
Apple Cinema Display (1999–2011)
Apple Thunderbolt Display (2011–2016)
Pro Display XDR (2019–Current)

References

External links 
  – official site

Apple Inc. displays
Apple Inc. peripherals
Computer-related introductions in 2022